Wheeler Creek may refer to:

Wheeler Creek (Eel River), a stream in Indiana
Wheeler Creek (Grindstone Creek), a stream in Missouri
Wheeler Creek (Montana), a stream in Flathead County, Montana